Showdown: Legends of Wrestling is a professional wrestling video game developed by Acclaim Studios Austin and published by Acclaim Entertainment for the PlayStation 2 and Xbox in 2004. It is the sequel to the 2002 video game Legends of Wrestling II. A GameCube version of the game was also planned, but was cancelled. Showdown is the third game in the Legends of Wrestling video game series. It was the last game developed by the Austin studio prior to its closure later that year, and the last game released by Acclaim Entertainment in North America.

Roster
A significant coup for Showdown: LoW was the inclusion of Ultimate Warrior who had been in legal disputes with WWE and successfully had his likeness excluded from WWE SmackDown! Here Comes the Pain the previous year. Also noteworthy is the absence of two Von Erich brothers, Mike and David, who were in both previous Legends of Wrestling games.

Some minor new features included a tribute to deceased legendary wrestlers as well as a tutorial fully narrated by Bret Hart.

Music
The theme music in the last two games was composed by "The Mouth of The South" Jimmy Hart. Hart appears as a playable character in all three games. He also composed some of the theme music for World Championship Wrestling and World Wrestling Federation/Entertainment. The 1983 song "Metal Health" by Quiet Riot is used in promo videos for the game and is played at the main menu and Create-a-Legend screens.

Reception

Showdown: Legends of Wrestling received "mixed or average" reviews, according to review aggregator Metacritic.

Xbox Nation called it "a steaming doodie. With extra stank on it." Consumer reaction was negative too, though not excessively so, primarily tempered by the stellar roster available in the game. The inclusion of former WCW commentary team of Bobby "The Brain" Heenan, Tony Schiavone, "The Living Legend" Larry Zbyszko and ring announcer 
Gary Michael Cappetta was welcomed. The commentary system turned out to be a failure, however, being unsophisticated and repetitive. It has arguably the best roster of popular 1970s, 1980s, and 1990s pro-wrestlers, including many 'legends' who didn't appear in the first two games.

The game was riddled with many serious bugs, glitches, crashes, and lock-ups. This suggested that Showdown: LoW was a rushed product with little attention to quality assurance on Acclaim's part. Other major negative aspects of the game are terribly lacking opponent AI, sluggish character movement, and clumsy game controls. Errors and omissions in the accompanying instruction booklet compounded this. The game's box also advertised commentary from Jerry "The King" Lawler which also was omitted from the game.

See also

List of licensed wrestling video games
List of fighting games

References

External links

2004 video games
Acclaim Entertainment games
Cancelled GameCube games
Cancelled Windows games
Legends of Wrestling (series)
PlayStation 2 games
Video games with custom soundtrack support
Xbox games
Professional wrestling games
Video games based on real people
Cultural depictions of professional wrestlers
Video games developed in the United States